Zoo Junction is a junction on Amtrak's Northeast Corridor in Philadelphia, Pennsylvania where the Northeast Corridor meets the Keystone Corridor (ex-Pennsylvania Railroad main line).

History
 

Zoo Junction is a flying junction, where multiple tracks cross one another by bridges to avoid conflict with other trains.

In 1870, the Pennsylvania Railroad built the Connecting Railway from Frankford Junction to Zoo to bypass congested street running in Philadelphia. Instead of reaching the city directly from the north, the Connecting Railway turned west, crossed the Schuylkill River on the  Connecting Railway Bridge (a stone arch viaduct) and then turned south to join the PRR's Main Line at Mantua Junction. Mantua was a wye junction controlled by three manual signal boxes; there was also an engine house and the massive 37th Street Yard in the center of the wye.

By 1888 the Mantua Junction was at capacity. In 1910 the PRR built two duck-under tunnels to allow trains to reach the Connecting Railway without blocking the Main Line and 37th Street Yard. The eastern 36th Street Tunnel also allowed grade-separated access to the Junction Railroad connecting to the Philadelphia and Reading Railway. Today, the tunnel only connects to the Northeast Corridor and is used by SEPTA, while the Junction Railroad now connects to the West Philadelphia Elevated as part of the CSX Harrisburg Subdivision. The western tunnel, called the New York-Pittsburgh Subway, allowed trains running from New York to Pittsburgh and west (such as the Broadway Limited) to bypass Broad Street station and a prolonged reverse move; such express trains would only stop in North Philadelphia. In 1935, the interlocking reached its final form in conjunction with electrification and the construction of 30th Street Station and Suburban Station. Suburban commuter trains were routed to 30th Street's upper level towards Suburban, while intercity trains ran to the lower level.

In the crescent-shaped pocket between the junction and the river is the Philadelphia Zoo, which gave the interlocking its name. The former Zoological Garden station was located next to the interlocking to serve visitors to the Zoo.

References

Rail junctions in the United States
Rail transportation in Philadelphia
Amtrak
Pennsylvania Railroad lines